A number of concertos (as well as non-concerto works) have been written for the oboe, both as a solo instrument as well as in conjunction with other solo instrument(s), and accompanied by string orchestra, chamber orchestra, full orchestra, concert band, or similar large ensemble.

These include concertos by the following composers:

Baroque

Tomaso Albinoni
Johann Sebastian Bach (reconstruction from harpsichord concerto)
Johann Friedrich Fasch
Christoph Förster
Carl Heinrich Graun
Christoph Graupner
George Frideric Handel
Johann Adolph Hasse
Alessandro Marcello
Johann Joachim Quantz
Alessandro Scarlatti
Giovanni Battista Sammartini
Giuseppe Sammartini
Georg Philipp Telemann
Antonio Vivaldi

Classical

Carl Philipp Emanuel Bach
Johann Christian Bach
Ludwig van Beethoven
Carlo Besozzi
Domenico Cimarosa
Carl Ditters von Dittersdorf
Josef Fiala
Joseph Haydn (doubtful)
William Herschel
Franz Anton Hoffmeister
Ignaz Holzbauer
Jan Antonín Koželuh
Franz Krommer
Ludwig August Lebrun
Wolfgang Amadeus Mozart
Antonio Rosetti
Antonio Salieri
Carl Stamitz
Johann Stamitz
Peter von Winter

Romantic

Vincenzo Bellini
Jan Kalivoda
Bernhard Molique
Antonio Pasculli
Richard Strauss (concerto)
Carl Maria von Weber (spurious)

Contemporary

Kalevi Aho
William Alwyn

Hendrik Andriessen
Malcolm Arnold
Tadeusz Baird
Sally Beamish
David Bedford
Arthur Benjamin (on themes of Domenico Cimarosa)
Lennox Berkeley
Michael Berkeley
John Biggs
Judith Bingham
Anthony Burgess
Edwin Carr
Elliott Carter
Mario Castelnuovo-Tedesco
John Corigliano
Peter Maxwell Davies
Edison Denisov
Bill Douglas
Joël-François Durand
Ross Edwards
Lukas Foss
Jean Françaix
John Gardner
Eugene Goossens
Michael Zev Gordon
Helen Grime
John Harbison
Christos Hatzis
Frigyes Hidas
Jennifer Higdon
Alan Hovhaness
Jacques Ibert
Gordon Jacob
John Joubert
Jouni Kaipainen
Graeme Koehne
Thomas Oboe Lee
Malcolm Lipkin
Bent Lorentzen
Salvatore Macchia
James MacMillan
Bruno Maderna
Ursula Mamlok
Bohuslav Martinů
Peter Mieg
Darius Milhaud
Anthony Milner
Paul Moravec
Dominic Muldowney
David Mullikin
Thea Musgrave
Arne Nordheim
Sean Osborn
Haim Permont
Osmo Tapio Räihälä
Bernard Rands
Alan Rawsthorne
Malcolm D Robertson
George Rochberg
Christopher Rouse
Edwin Roxburgh
Andrey Rubtsov
Poul Ruders
Harald Sæverud
Peter Schickele
Roger Steptoe
Hilary Tann
Ralph Vaughan Williams
Carl Vine
Gwyneth Walker
Grace Williams
John Williams
Ermanno Wolf-Ferrari
John Woolrich
Marco Aurelio Yano
Isang Yun
Eugene Zador
Bernd Alois Zimmermann
Ellen Taaffe Zwilich

See also
Concerto
Bass oboe concerto
English horn concerto
Bassoon concerto

References